Sophie Antonie Luise Schröder (née Bürger) (1 March 1781 - 25 February 1868) was a German actress.

She was born at Paderborn, the daughter of an actor, Gottfried Bürger.
She made her first appearance in opera at St Petersburg, in 1793. On Kotzebue's recommendation she was engaged for the Vienna Court theatre in 1798, and here and in Munich and Hamburg she won great successes in tragic roles like Marie Stuart, Phèdre, Merope, Lady Macbeth, and Isabella in The Bride of Messina, which gave her the reputation of being "the German Siddons." 

She retired in 1840 and lived in Augsburg and Munich until her death in 1868. She had married, in 1795, an actor, Stollmers (properly Smets), from whom she separated in 1799. In 1804 she married the tenor Friedrich Schröder, and after his death in 1818, she married the actor, Wilhelm Kunst in 1825. Schröder's eldest daughter was the opera singer, Wilhelmine Schröder-Devrient. She had several illegitimate children with the painter Moritz Michael Daffinger.

References
 This work in turn cites:
 Ph. Schmidt, Sophie Schröder (Vienna, 1870)
 Das Lexikon der deutschen Bühnen-Angehörigen

External links
Schröder, Sophie. In: Constant von Wurzbach: Biographisches Lexikon des Kaiserthums Oesterreich, 31. Band, Wien 1876, S. 321–334. (Biographical Encyclopedia of the Kingdom of Austria) 
Lexikon Westfälischer Autorinnen und Autoren (Encyclopedia of Westphalian Authors) 

1781 births
1868 deaths
People from Paderborn
18th-century German actresses
19th-century German actresses
German stage actresses